Riccieli Eduardo da Silva Junior (born 17 September 1998), known as Riccieli, is a Brazilian footballer who plays for F.C. Famalicão as a defender.

Career statistics

References

External links

1998 births
Living people
Brazilian footballers
Association football defenders
Campeonato Brasileiro Série D players
Primeira Liga players
Mirassol Futebol Clube players
F.C. Famalicão players
Brazilian expatriate footballers
Expatriate footballers in Portugal